Conroy Education Center provides education for children with special needs in the Pittsburgh Public Schools.   The school was added to the National Register of Historic Places on September 30, 1986 as Conroy Junior High School, and the List of Pittsburgh History and Landmarks Foundation Historic Landmarks in 2001.

References

External links

School buildings on the National Register of Historic Places in Pennsylvania
Schools in Pittsburgh
Art Deco architecture in Pennsylvania
Renaissance Revival architecture in Pennsylvania
Pittsburgh History & Landmarks Foundation Historic Landmarks
School buildings completed in 1936
National Register of Historic Places in Pittsburgh